Groundskeeping is the activity of tending an area of land for aesthetic or functional purposes, typically in an institutional setting. It includes mowing grass, trimming hedges, pulling weeds, planting flowers, etc. The U.S. Department of Labor estimated that more than 900,000 workers are employed in the landscape maintenance and groundskeeping services industry in the United States in 2006. Of these over 300,000 workers were greenskeepers for golf courses, schools, resorts, and public parks. Compare gardener.

Occupation

A groundskeeper is a person who maintains landscaping, gardens or sporting venues (and their vegetation where appropriate) for appearance and functionality. In Britain the word groundsman (occasionally groundswoman if appropriate) or park-keeper is used much more commonly. The Football Association confers a Groundsman of the Year award. In Australia, the word curator is often used for a person undertaking this job, especially those involving cricket pitches. At university campuses, groundskeepers are often called horticulturists. The equivalent on a golf course is a greenskeeper.

The U.S. Bureau of Labor Statistics (BLS) estimated in May 2015 that statistical group 37-3011 "Landscaping and Groundskeeping Workers" numbered 895,600 with a median annual wage of $25,030. The BLS describes the functions of this group as "Workers typically perform a variety of tasks, which may include any combination of the following: sod laying, mowing, trimming, planting, watering, fertilizing, digging, raking, sprinkler installation, and installation of mortarless segmental concrete masonry wall units".

A groundskeeper's job requires a wide range of knowledge of horticulture, pest control, and weed abatement. As many institutions (especially schools) are moving away from the use of chemical pesticides and toward integrated pest management the experience, knowledge and scholastic requirements of top groundskeepers are increasing. While groundskeepers usually follow a site plan created by a landscape architect, there can be many opportunities for creativity in detailed design and presentation.

Equipment

Groundskeeping equipment comprise tools and vehicles used in groundskeeping, including:

 mowers
 lawn mowers
 tractors
 string trimmers
 snow blowers
 snow plows
 edgers
 rotary brushes
 rakes
 leaf blowers
 shovels
 trowels
 sprinklers
 garden tools
 watering cans or truck mounted watering system
 line markers

Environmental impact
Pollution from predominantly 2-stroke gas-powered groundskeeping equipment is a source of air pollution. US emission standards specifically limit emissions from small engines, which results in their continual improvement.  Electric models produce no emissions at the point of use, but may shift pollution to power plants.

See also
 Turf management
 Professional Grounds Management Society

References

Gardening
Lawn care